The Minillas Tunnel is a tunnel located in San Juan, Puerto Rico. The tunnel starts at the end of Puerto Rico Highway 22 (unsigned Interstate PR2), in the area of Santurce, exiting near El Condado. The tunnel was built from 1978 through 1980.

See also
 Puerto Rico Highway 22
 Minillas
 Papago Freeway tunnel - A similar tunnel located in Phoenix, Arizona

1980 establishments in Puerto Rico
Road tunnels in the United States